Foxtrot Six is an Indonesian science fiction action film that premiered on February 21, 2019. The film was directed by Randy Korompis as his directorial debut, and co-produced with Mario Kassar, a veteran Hollywood film producer known for films such as Terminator 2: Judgment Day, and Manoj Punjabi under the production house MD Entertainment and Rapid Eye Pictures. The production of this film spent a budget of up to IDR 70 billion which was considered the largest for an Indonesian action film when it was released.

Despite being an Indonesian film, the language used in dialogues of this film is English, due to it being marketed internationally. This film stars Indonesia's top artists such as Oka Antara, Verdi Solaiman, Chicco Jerikho, Arifin Putra and Rio Dewanto. The choreography of the fighting action in this film is handled by Iko Uwais' 'Uwais Team' fighting choreography team.

Plot 

In 2019, former Indonesian Marine soldier and journalist Angga Saputra proposes to his girlfriend and fellow journalist Sari Nirmala moments before she leaves for Solo to interview the newly democratically elected president, Indra. The same day, a revolution led by PIRANAS breaks out and she and the elected president are declared missing.

11 years later, Angga has become a PIRANAS cadre and now is a congressman of the party. The ongoing food and economy crisis has given rise to a rebel group called "Reform", and to eliminate that group and improve the party's approval rating, he proposes the black ops project "Patriot Act" to the Four Horsemen of PIRANAS Party: President of Indonesia Ahmad Barona, head of PIRANAS propaganda affairs Hengky Laksono, GERRAM paramilitary commander General Adnan Atmadja, and Party Chairman Farid Baskoro. The Four Horsemen accept under the condition that Wisnu "The Wolf" Nugroho, an ardent PIRANAS cadre and fanatical GERRAM executive officer, becomes the head of the operation, and Angga reluctantly meets Wisnu at the GERRAM secret HQ in Jakarta. Angga notices that they are being spied by a drone, and while Wisnu and his men go to pursue the drone, Angga is abducted by a group of armed men led by Spec.

The men turn out to be Reform members and they bring Angga to their hideout where he reunites with Sari, who had gone into hiding with Indra and founded the Reform in order to topple the corrupt regime, and also meets his and Sari's daughter Dinda, who was born while she was in hiding. Wisnu and the GERRAM death squad attack the hideout and Angga, Dinda, Sari, and Spec escape to an abandoned shopping mall which has become a hideout for Indra's men, supporters, and displaced people hiding from GERRAM brutality. Angga resolves to help the people and gathers his former Marine team Foxtrot 5: Oggi, Bara, Tino, and Ethan. Together with Spec, the team unofficially becomes Foxtrot 6.

Ethan hacks PIRANAS server and they learn about PIRANAS plan to kill its own senators in a false flag operation to frame the Reform and enact a mass state-sanctioned genocide to purge any voice opposing the PIRANAS and Ahmad's administration. GERRAM manage to track them and assault Ethan's apartment building, and they escape.

On the D-day of the plan, GERRAM members attack the senators' convoy, but the Reforms intervene and manage to save them. When they returned to the shelter, Wisnu and his squad are already there and have detained Indra and Sari, while Dinda and several civilians have been locked in a freight elevator. Wisnu hangs the senators with a crane and videotapes their death as false evidence, and his team proceed to set fire to the mall. While Dinda manages to activate the elevator emergency brakes and save the civilians, Angga could not save Sari in time and she falls to her death.

After they escape the burning building, they learn that Spec had called the Indonesian Marines and they have set up a base outside. Angga's bodyguard Sgt. N. "Raya" Pratama is among them, and she gives them access to a plane and military equipment to launch a suicide mission to overthrow Ahmad. Across the country, PIRANAS is repeatedly airing the senators' killing video.

The Foxtrot 6 successfully infiltrate the PIRANAS complex. Oggi falls in the ensuing battle. Gen. Adnan is killed by Ethan with a commandeered Kodiaks powered exoskeleton armor, while Farid escapes. Angga and Ethan reach the presidential office, take Hengky as hostage and force him to make a confession about PIRANAS conspiracy. Before he can confess, Ahmad shows up and kills him before leaving for Istana Negara with his guards. Wisnu stabs Ethan from behind and fights Angga on the rooftop helipad. Wisnu shoots Angga down with his last bullet.

At Istana Negara, Ahmad announces the law which authorizes civilians to kill any Reform members (mimicking the Indonesian mass killings of 1965–66) before a crowd of citizens. However, the video screens around him suddenly play Ahmad's earlier incriminating conversation with Angga, which Ethan had recorded with the Kodiaks onboard camera before succumbing to his injuries and is broadcast by Angga from the PIRANAS HQ. Realizing what actually happened, public support for PIRANAS drops immediately and the crowd storm the Istana Negara. Outside the burning PIRANAS HQ, Wisnu and his surviving men are confronted and brutally killed by angry villagers waiting for them. 

A week after the incident, Angga and Bara attend the funeral of Sari, Oggi, and Ethan. Spec's body was not found, while Tino had bailed out earlier without saying anything. Ahmad's administration has collapsed and the president has been arrested by law enforcement and is awaiting his trial, while PIRANAS has completely been dissolved. Angga and Dinda enjoy a walk in the city, no longer living in fear.

Somewhere, a United States helicopter lands and Spec boards it with several US Marines saluting him, implying that Spec is actually an American operative. Since the US also aided GERRAM with military equipment in the beginning of the film, their involvement is up to the audience's imagination.

In the post-credit scene, Angga, Oggi, Tino, and Ethan receive a box full of Kit Kat from an unknown person.

Cast

Production 
Foxtrot Six is directorial debut of Randy Korompis, a former cameraman of Screenplay (2011) and Hollywood Seagull (2013). The production phase of Foxtrot Six took unusually long time. The screenwriting wrote since 2010, pre-production at 2015, started filming at 2017, and finally released at 2019. Overall, the production spanned across 9 years. Mario Kassar, executive producer of Terminator and Rambo franchise, became the executive producer of this film.

Foxtrot Six also renowned as the first Indonesian film that use CGI fully. The CGI process was handled and/or supervised by Andrew Juano, who succeeded in handling CGI of The Walking Dead and Life of Pi.

Release 
The film released in Indonesia on 21 February 2019.

Reception 
The reception of Foxtrot Six is quite mixed. Foxtrot Six was praised for bringing up themes that are quite rarely explored in Indonesian movies: state, politics, rebellion against tyranny, poverty, and public chaos. Foxtrot Six are praised for the involvement of many Indonesian stars during the making, full of extreme actions, and unusually large and expensive production value for Indonesian film with IDR 70 billion spent during the process, making Foxtrot Six an elegant and luxurious movie that became the most expensive Indonesia made to this date. Critics also praised the use of English, which the stars of this movie are clearly well-versed at. The use of English as the main language for the movie’s dialogues was intended rather than Indonesian due to Mario Kassar’s intention of bringing the film to Hollywood. However, the film also has several weakness, mainly in plot holes and background story of the characters being largely under explored.

References

External links 
 

Indonesian action films
2019 science fiction action films
English-language Indonesian films
2010s English-language films